Abay Opera House is one of the leading opera houses in Kazakhstan located in Almaty city.

History 
Before becoming a theatre, Abay Opera House was found as a music studio in 1933 in Almaty. Since 1934 it became a theatre. In 1941 was the official opening of the new theater building and in 1945 was named after Kazakh poet, composer, and philosopher Abay Qunanbayuli.

On January 13, 1934, the first public performance of the musical comedy "Aiman Sholpan" on a libretto by Mukhtar Auezov took place under the auspices of the music studio. The work included folk songs and cues arranged by Ivan Kotsyk. This event is considered the birthday of the Kazakh Musical Theater.
Evgeny Brusilovsky became the first composer of the theater, who laid the foundation of the national opera art of Kazakhstan. Brusilovsky composed the operas "Kyz-Zhibek" (1934), "Zhalbyr" (1935), "Er Targyn" (1936).
In 1935, on the basis of the Kuibyshev Opera House was created by the Russian opera company. The professional company in a short period of time (1936–1937) staged nine productions of Russian and world opera classics: "Carmen", "Eugene Onegin", "The Queen of Spades", "Demon", "Faust", "Aida" and others.

Since 1937, the theater has been referred to as the Kazakh Opera and Ballet Theater. Through an exchange of experience with the artists of the Kuibyshev (now Samara) Opera and Ballet Theatre, a ballet company was organized, which carried out its first productions: "Coppélia" by Leo Delibe (1937, choreographer Yu. P. Kovalev), "Swan Lake" by Tchaikovsky (1938, choreographer L. Zhukov). In 1938, the first Kazakh ballet, Kalkaman and Mamyr by Vasily Velikanov, was also staged.
In the early 1950s, the theater employed the famous Soviet choreographer Mikhail Moiseyev, who staged such ballets as "The Red Poppy" by Rheingold Gliere, "Kambar and Nazym" by V. Velikanov. In the mid-1950s, choreographer Dauren Abirov staged such ballets as Mikhail Chulaki's Youth (1952), Antonio Spadavecchia's The Coast of Happiness (1953), R. Gliere's The Bronze Horseman (1955) and Farid Yarullin's Shurale (1956). At the same time, Zaurbek Raybayev joined the company and became not only a dancer, but also a director of several ballets: Mikhail Fokin's Chopiniana to music by Frideric Chopin, Maurice Ravel's Bolero, Tchaikovsky's Francesca da Rimini and Gaziza Zhubanova's The Legend of the White Bird (together with Dmitry Abirov).
In the 1970s, a famous conductor and director, Honored Artist of the Kazakh SSR Valery Rutter staged 15 operas and ballets at the Abai State Academic Theatre. Other famous productions of that period are the operas "Alpamys" (1973) by E. Rakhmadiev, "Enlik and Kebek" (1975) by G. Zhubanova, the ballets "Spartak" by Aram Khachaturian (choreographer Z. Raibayev), "The Russian Tale" by M. Chulaki, "Aksak-kulan" by A. Serkebayev (choreographer and dancer Mintai Tleubayev) and "The Cinderella" by G. Chulayev, "Aliya" by Mansur Sagatov (choreographer Zhanat Baidaralin).

Over forty western and Kazakh pieces are performed, including operas, ballets and classical music performances. Another famous opera staged in the Abay Opera House – "Abay", music by Akhmed Zhubanov and Latif Khamidi, libretto by Mukhtar Auezov.

By the Decree of the President of the Republic of Kazakhstan the theater was given "national" status on December 19, 2020.

Construction 
Construction of the building started in 1936 and was completed in 1941 (by architectors Kruglov N.A., Prostakov N.A. and Basenov T.K.). The building is designed in stalinist empire style combined with Italian classicism and national Kazakh elements. The first performance in the new building took place on November 7, 1941.
The first floor with large-rusted wall surfaces compositionally serves as a kind of stereobath of the entire building. The zones of the second and third floors are accented with fine rustication. The portico has powerful pylons passing into the blank side walls. On the pylons in the bas-relief ornamental frames forming a lancet arch there are quotations on the issues of art taken from the works of Lenin. The crowning of the main facade is made in the form of a rather high entablature with a lattice ornamental parapet. Frieze occupied by alternating patterns multifigure relief on the theme of art figures of Kazakhstan. At its level on the pylons are placed large ornamental cartouches.
The side facades are solved by the metric members, created by staggered pilasters and large rectangular windows. The patterns are included in the broad platbands of rectangular doorways, ogival windows and shallow niches with texts, grids of second floor loggia railings, frieze panels, architrave and cornice bands, capitals and bases of pilasters and columns, parapet grating, cartouches of lamps. The configuration, size of the elements and height of the relief of the ornaments are differentiated depending on the place in the composition and the surface of placement.
The last renovation of the building was completed in 2000, preserving the basic architectural style.

Management 
Before the collapse of the USSR, it was managed by the Ministry of Culture of the Kazakh SSR. After that it management passed to the Ministry of Culture of the Republic of Kazakhstan. Nowadays it is managed by the Ministry of Culture and Sports of the Republic of Kazakhstan.

The stars of the opera company 

 Kurmanbek Dzhandarbekov (1933–1944)
 Kulyash Bayseitova (1933–1957)
 Garifulla Kurmangaliyev (1934–1966)
 Zhamal Omarova (1934–1937)
 Rishat Abdullin (1939–1985)
 Baygali Dosymzhanov (1941–1964)
 Shabal Beisekova (1941–1966)
 Kauken Kenzhetaev (1946–1966)
 Roza Baglanova (1947–1949)
 Yermek Serkebayev (1947–2006)
 Roza Djanova (1953–1977)
 Bibigul Tulegenova (1954–1956), (1971–1982)
 Alibek Dnishev (1978–1997)
 Nurzhamal Usenbayeva (1984–1997)
 Maira Mukhamed-kyzy (1996–2002)

The stars of the ballet company 

 Shara Zhienkulova (1934–1940)
 Alexander Seleznyov (1937–1945)
 Inessa Manskaya (1945–1965)
 Bulat Ayukhanov (1957–1959)
 Lyudmila Rudakova (1965–1980)
 Ramazan Bapov (1966–1988)
 Raushan Bayseitova (1966–1986)
 Larisa Sycheva (1974–1978)
 Maira Kadyrova (1976–1997)
 Gulzhan Tutkibayeva (1982–2002)
 Saule Rakhmedova (1987–1989, 2009–2019)
 Kuralai Sarkytbayeva (1993–2006)
 Leyla Alpieva (1995–1996) and (2000–2009)
 Serzhan Kaukov (1998–1999)
 Doszhan Tabyldy (2003–2005)
 Farhad Buriev (2005–2017)
 Gulvira Kurbanova (2004–present)

Theater repertoire

Opera 

 Abay
 Aida
 Abylai Khan
 Aisulu
 Masquerade ball
 Birzhan and Sarah
 Bohemia
 Merry widow
 Anne Frank's diary
 Don Pasquale
 Eugene Onegin
 Enlik kebek
 Cinderella
 Iolanta
 Pearl seekers

Ballet 

 Anna Karenina
 Bakhchisarai fountain
 La Bayadere
 Bolero
 Don Quixote
 Giselle
 Carmen Suite
 Carmina Burana
 Coppelia
 Corsair
 Swan Lake
 The legend of love
 Pavana Mavra
 Pulcinella
 Romeo and Juliet

See also
 Panfilov Street Promenade

References

External links
Official website

Opera houses in Kazakhstan
Music venues in Kazakhstan
Theatres in Kazakhstan
Buildings and structures in Almaty
1934 establishments in the Soviet Union
Buildings and structures built in the Soviet Union
Theatres completed in 1934
Music venues completed in 1934
Tourist attractions in Almaty